"Freefallin" is a song performed by Australian singer-songwriter, Zoë Badwi. The dance-pop song was written by Cameron Denny, Amy Pearson and Paul Zala and produced by Denzal Park. It was released as a download on 16 July 2010. The song also serves as third single from her debut album Zoë (2011).

Background 
Badwi stated in an interview with the Herald Sun that as soon as she heard the track, it got her moving and that it was the first song she hadn't written. "Amy Pearson wrote the lyrics. It's the first one I haven't written. That was weird at first but it's such a good song I couldn't deny it. I've written with Amy before, we've got a good chemistry. She said, I think I've got a song you might like. I'll send it to you. I loved it."

Track listing

Australian download 
 Freefallin (3:16)

French download 
 FreeFallin' (Radio Edit) (3:16)
 FreeFallin' (6:07)
 FreeFallin' (Acoustic) (2:43)

Complete download 
 Freefallin (Denzal Park Remix) (6:07)
 Freefallin' (Tv Rock & Nordean Remix) (7:26)
 Freefallin' (Moto Blanco Radio Edit) (3:38)
 Freefallin' (WAWA Radio Edit) (2:35)
 Freefallin' (Hardforze Remix) (5:26)
 Freefallin' (Tune Brothers Remix) (7:45)
 Freefallin' (Alex Mac 2.0 Remix) (6:07)
 Freefallin' (Blaze Tripp Remix) (5:50)
 Freefallin' (I Am Sam Remix) (6:52)
 Freefallin' (UK Radio Edit) (2:35)
 Freefallin' (Acoustic) (2:43)

Charts
"Freefallin" debuted on the ARIA Singles Chart at number thirty six, before reaching its peak of number nine in its seventh week on the chart and was eventually certified platinum. The song peaked at number 71 on New Zealand Airplay Charts, staying for five weeks.

Certification

Year-end charts

iTunes Release history

References

2010 singles
2010 songs
APRA Award winners
Dance-pop songs
Electronic dance music songs
House music songs
Songs written by Amy Pearson
Zoë Badwi songs